King Yuri (38 BCE – 18 CE, r. 19 BCE – 18 CE) was the second ruler of Goguryeo, the northernmost of the Three Kingdoms of Korea.  He was the eldest son of the kingdom's founder Chumo the Holy. As with many other early Korean rulers, the events of his life are known largely from the Samguk Sagi.

Reign 
Yuri is described as a powerful and militarily successful king. He conquered a Xianbei tribe in 9 BCE with the help of Bu Bun-no. In 3 BCE, Yuri moved the capital from Jolbon to Gungnae. The Han dynasty was overthrown by Wang Mang, who established the Xin dynasty. In 12 CE Wang Mang sent a messenger to Goguryeo to ask for troops to assist in the conquest of the Xiongnu. Yuri rejected the request and instead attacked Xin.

He had six sons and among them were Haemyeong and Muhyul. Haemyeong was proclaimed the crown prince of Goguryeo after the death of Dojeol, who was King Yuri's eldest son. But Yuri found Haemyeong to be too reckless and disobedient. Yuri replaced him with the younger son Muhyul in 14 CE. , Muhyul was Yuri's son with the daughter of Songyang.  Muhyul ruled later as King Daemusin of Goguryeo.

A poem Yuri was said to have written for his favoured concubine Chihui has survived.  It is titled the Hwangjoga ( "Song of the Yellow Bird").

Succession 
King Yuri died in 18 CE, after ruling for 37 years. He was succeeded by his youngest remaining son, Muhyul, who became King Daemusin.

Family
Father: King Dongmyeong (동명성왕, 東明聖王)
Grandmother: Lady Ha Yuhwa (하유화, 河柳花)
Mother: Lady Ye (예씨 부인, 禮氏 夫人)
Consorts and their respective issue(s):
Queen, of the Song clan (왕후 송씨, 王后 松氏); daughter of Song Yang, Marquis Damul (송양 다물후, 松讓 多勿侯).
Prince Dojeol (도절, 都切; d. 1 AD)
Prince Haemyeong (해명, 解明; 12 BC – 9 AD)
Prince Muhyul (무휼, 無恤; 4–44 AD)
Prince Yeojin (여진, 如津; d. 18 AD)
Prince Saekju (색주, 色朱; d. 48 AD)
Prince Jaesa (재사, 再思)
Prince Yeoyul (여율, 如栗)
Lady Hwahui (화희, 禾姬)
Lady Chihui (치희, 雉姬)

Theories regarding King Yuri

Usurpation theory 
In recent studies, some historians have made a series of observations regarding Goguryeo's establishment that led them to think of Yuri may not have been the son of Go Jumong, but a usurper.

The observations that led to this conclusion were Jumong's early death, the difference in surnames, Yuri's harsh behavior toward some of Jumong's most prized subjects, and the differences in the styles of rule. Jumong died at the age of 40, which is quite early compared to that of some of his successors and predecessors. Very few of the rulers of that time period died before the age of 40. The difference in surnames may signify dynastic change from the Go family to the Hae family.

Another startling point to consider is the fact that most of Jumong's most trusted subjects were exiled or resigned. An example is Hyeob-bo, who was among Jumong's first three followers. According to the first Goguryeo volume of the Chronicles of the Three Kingdoms (Samguk Sagi), Hyeob-bu disagreed with the way King Yuri continually left the palace to go on hunting trips and strongly urged the King to be more attentive to matters of the kingdom.

However, Yuri grew annoyed and forced Hyub-bo(陜父) to resign from his office. However, this claim may be proven counteracted with the fact that not all of Jumong's subjects were removed. General Bu Bun-no(扶芬奴) and Oi served Goguryeo through most of King Yuri's reign and played active roles in the kingdom. Goguryeo under Yuri did not display the strict expansionist policy that existed under Jumong. A final observation is the mentioning of a broken sword in the legend.

Some historians have inferred that Yuri finding a piece of Jumong's broken sword and using it as a claim signifies the collapse of Jumong's regime, and Yuri's rise to the throne. Overall, the fact that Jumong died five months after the arrival of Yuri caused the suspicion of these select historians. However, this is merely a theory and no assumptions can be made.

A theory regarding Go and Hae surnames 

A theory and reason for the changes of surnames in the royal family is that, since king Yuri of Goguryeo as young man grew up without his father and outside of the Go royal family,  possibly had another surname than the Go surname. When Yuri as an adult returned to the royal Go -household (with the surname Hae) and became a king, he did not change his surname, for there was no urgent need for that. His surname Hae is believed to have originated from Hae Mosu, who was possibly the father of King Dongmyeongseong. For that reason the surname of the 2nd, 3rd, 4th and 5th monarchs of Goguryeo remained Hae. Those monarchs were either the sons of Yuri or had a father who was a predecessor king. So therefore the surname Hae remained as the royal surname of Goguryeo monarchy for a period of time.

But when the 6th monarch of Goguryeo, Taejodae of Goguryeo, ascended the throne after a power struggle for the throne, (between him and the descendants of the above mentioned Hea monarchs), he changed the royal Surname back to Go. The reason for that was possibly his lack of a father who was predecessor king, and his need to strengthen his claim to the throne. Whiteout the surname Go, Taejodae's claim to the throne would have been very weak compared to the living royal sons of the Hae monarchs.

Popular culture
 Portrayed by Ahn Yong-joon and Jung Yun-seok in the 2006-2007 MBC TV series Jumong.
 Portrayed by Jung Jin-young in the 2008–2009 KBS2 TV series The Kingdom of the Winds.
 Portrayed by Park Jung-woo in the 2010–2011 KBS1 TV series The King of Legend.

See also
History of Korea
Three Kingdoms of Korea
List of Korean monarchs

References

38 BC births
18 deaths
1st-century BC rulers in Asia
1st-century monarchs in Asia
Goguryeo
Goguryeo rulers
People whose existence is disputed
1st-century Korean people
1st-century BC Korean people